Li Li Leung (born ) is an American businesswoman and former artistic gymnast. She became the president and CEO of USA Gymnastics in February 2019. She was previously the vice president of the NBA.

Early life and education 
After commencing gymnastics training at the age of 7, Leung participated in the 1988 Junior Pan American Games in Puerto Rico where she placed third in the all-around in the youth division. 

Following her club competitive career, she attended the University of Michigan where she competed for the Michigan Wolverines women's gymnastics team. At Michigan, she was a three-time All-Academic Big Ten Conference competitor. She graduated from Michigan in 1995 with a bachelor's degree in Psychology. She later attended grad school at the University of Massachusetts at Amherst, where she received an MBA in Business and Sport Management in 2003 from the Isenberg School of Management.

References

Living people
American women chief executives
American female artistic gymnasts
University of Michigan College of Literature, Science, and the Arts alumni
Isenberg School of Management alumni
Year of birth missing (living people)
Women in American professional sports management
American chief executives of professional sports organizations
Michigan Wolverines women's gymnasts
National Basketball Association executives
Gymnasts from New Jersey
Businesspeople from New Jersey